Dialogues in Clinical Neuroscience is a quarterly peer-reviewed medical journal covering neurology and clinical neuropsychiatry. It was established in 1999 and was originally published by Laboratoires Servier. Starting 2022, the journal is published by Taylor & Francis on behalf of the World Federation of Societies of Biological Psychiatry. The editor-in-chief is Florence Thibaut (Hospital Cochin).

Abstracting and indexing
The journal is abstracted and indexed in:
Index Medicus/MEDLINE/PubMed
Science Citation Index Expanded
Embase
Scopus 
Elsevier Biobase

References

External links

Clinical psychology journals
Neurology journals
Neuropsychiatry
Neuroscience journals
Psychiatry journals
Publications established in 1999
Quarterly journals
English-language journals